Broken Arm Trio is an album by cellist Erik Friedlander, bassist Trevor Dunn, and drummer Mike Sarin performing compositions inspired by Oscar Pettiford's cello work and the music of Herbie Nichols.

Reception

PopMatters correspondent Michael Kabran concluded "Broken Arm Trio clearly features the work of three musicians who, while tremendously adept at playing jazz, are snuggly rooted in the rock and European classical and folk idioms". 
 
Writing for All About Jazz, Mark Corroto observed "Friedlander seems to be opening his music to jazz and no-jazz fans. Much like Bill Frisell and Charlie Haden's open arm approach to jazz that can swallow both country and classical, Friedlander is pushing his vision into the open ended world defined simply as music". On the same site Troy Collins noted "A tireless artist, always open to expanding the acoustic cello language, Broken Arm Trio is one of Friedlander's most refreshing and vibrant efforts". A.D. Amorosi stated in JazzTimes that "it’s gorgeous, soulful and smart".

Track listing
All compositions by Erik Friedlander
 "Spinning Plates" - 3:23   
 "Pearls" - 4:36   
 "Knife Points" - 2:36   
 "Jim Zipper" - 1:08   
 "Pretty Penny" - 4:15   
 "Easy" - 6:10   
 "Cake" - 3:38   
 "Buffalo" - 1:29   
 "Hop Skip" - 6:47   
 "Ink" - 2:01   
 "Big Shoes" - 4:13   
 "In the Spirit" - 4:00   
 "Tiny's" - 4:44

Personnel
Erik Friedlander – cello
Trevor Dunn - bass
Mike Sarin - drums

References 

2008 albums
Erik Friedlander albums